Daghi may refer to:
 Daghi, Kashmar
 Daghi, Nishapur